is a Japanese novel written by Mizuki Tsujimura, and published by Poplar Publishing in May 2017. A manga adaptation illustrated by Tomo Taketomi was serialized in Shueisha's seinen magazine Ultra Jump from June 2019 to February 2022, with its chapters collected into five tankōbon volumes. An anime film adaptation by A-1 Pictures premiered on December 23, 2022 in Japan.

Characters

Media

Novel
Written by Mizuki Tsujimura, Lonely Castle in the Mirror was originally published on May 11, 2017 through Poplar Publishing. The company re-released the novel in a two-volume paperback format in March 2021. The novel was published in English by Doubleday in April 2021.

Manga
A manga adaptation illustrated by Tomo Taketomi was serialized in Shueisha's seinen manga magazine Ultra Jump from June 19, 2019, to February 19, 2022. Shueisha collected its chapters into five tankōbon volumes, published from December 2019 to May 2022.

The manga is licensed in North America by Seven Seas Entertainment.

Anime film
An anime film adaptation was announced on February 24, 2022. It is produced by A-1 Pictures and directed by Keiichi Hara, with scripts written by Miho Maruo, character designs handled by Keigo Sasaki, who also serves as chief animation director, visual concept and castle design by Ilya Kuvshinov, and music composed by Harumi Fuuki. It premiered in Japan on December 23, 2022. Yuuri performed the film's theme song .

Reception
In 2017, the novel placed first in Kadokawa's Da Vinci magazine "Book of the Year" list. It also won the Japan Booksellers' Award in 2018.

The anime film adaptation debuted at 6th at the Japanese box office, earning million (million) on its opening weekend. Richard Eisenbeis of Anime News Network gave the film a 'B-', applauding its social commentary on bullying in Japan and its relatable cast of characters, but criticizing its plot twists, which are 'easy to see coming'. Writing for The Japan Times, Matt Schley gave the film 3 out of 5 stars, praising its social commentary and its characters as well while criticizing the direction of the film, which 'lacks anything resembling subtlety', noting its 'overbearing' soundtrack 'commanding its audience to feel at any given moment'. In 2023, the film was nominated for Animation of the Year at the 46th Japan Academy Film Prize.

References

External links
  
  
  
 

2017 Japanese novels
2022 anime films
A-1 Pictures
Anime and manga based on novels
Japanese novels adapted into films
Seinen manga
Seven Seas Entertainment titles
Shueisha manga